An auscultare, q.d. to hear, listen, was a person appointed, in monasteries, to hear the monks read prayers, who instructed them how to perform it, before they were admitted to read publicly in the church, or before the people. The purpose was to insure the reading of prayers with a graceful tone or accent, so to make an impression on the hearers.

"Quicunque Lecturus vel Cantaturus est aliquid in Monasterio; si necesse babeat ab eo, viz. Cantore, priusquam incipiat debet Auscultare." — Lanfranc in Decreta pro ordinis S. Benedicti.

References

See also
Auscultation

Christian religious occupations